Appleby-in-Westmorland is a market town and civil parish in the Eden District of Cumbria, England, with a population of 3,048 at the 2011 Census. Crossed by the River Eden, Appleby was the county town of the historic county of Westmorland. It was known just as Appleby until 1974–1976, when the council of the successor parish to the borough changed it to retain the name Westmorland, which was abolished as an administrative area under the Local Government Act 1972.

History
The town's name derives from the Old English æppel-by, meaning "farm or settlement with apple trees".

St Lawrence's Parish Church is recorded in the National Heritage List for England as a designated Grade I listed building. Appleby Castle was founded by Ranulf le Meschin in the early 12th century. The Borough followed by royal charter in 1179 and its Moot Hall was built about 1596. Surviving timbers in the roof had been felled between 1571 and 1596. In the Second English Civil War Appleby was placed under a siege, in which the Regicide Major General Thomas Harrison was wounded.

Appleby Grammar School dates from two chantry bequests in 1286. It was incorporated by Letters Patent of Queen Elizabeth in 1574. George Washington's father and two half-brothers, born in Virginia, were educated at Appleby Grammar School. He would have followed, but his father died suddenly in 1743, just as he reached the age when the two older boys had made the voyage.

Economy
Appleby is overlooked by the privately owned Appleby Castle, a largely Norman structure that served as home to Lady Anne Clifford in the 17th century. Appleby's main industry is tourism, through its history, remoteness and scenery, and its proximity to the Lake District, North Pennines, Swaledale and Howgill Fells.

From 1973 Ferguson Industrial Holdings Plc was based at Appleby Castle. WA Developments Limited, now Stobart Rail Limited, was long based in Appleby as a civil engineering firm founded by Andrew Tinkler and William Stobart, specialising in railway maintenance.

Appleby's economy is based mainly on the service sector, in small firms, eating houses and pubs. The private shops include butchers, grocers, bakers and newsagents. Appleby Creamery makes premium, hand-made cheeses, including Eden Valley Brie.

Events

Appleby and nearby villages host old-established events such as Warcop rushbearing, dating back at least to 1716.

The four-day Appleby Horse Fair is held on the first weekend of June. The earliest known record of it appears in a 12th-century charter from King Henry II of England.

Appleby Agricultural Society, founded in 1841, puts on an annual show. From 1989 to 2007 it hosted the Appleby Jazz Festival. More recently the town has held an annual themed carnival.

Other local events are listed on the community website.

Governance
Appleby was a parliamentary borough from medieval times, electing two Members of Parliament (MPs). By the 18th century it was a pocket borough, whose members were effectively in the gift of the Lowther family. They included William Pitt the Younger, who was MP for Appleby when he became Prime Minister in 1783, although he stood down in the next general election, preferring to take a Cambridge University seat.

A later Appleby member was Viscount Howick, later as Earl Grey the Prime Minister under whom the Great Reform Act of 1832 was passed. However, that did not save it from losing both members under the Act. As the only county town disenfranchised, Appleby was a controversial case in the debates on the Reform Bill, where the opposition attempted vainly to save it at least one MP. It gained a new charter in 1885.
 
The town remained a municipal borough until such status was abolished under the Local Government Act 1972. It was superseded by Eden district, based in Penrith. Despite this, it remained smaller in size and population than most urban districts, although with a larger population than some early Westmorland urban districts such as Grasmere and Shap.

Appleby was the county town of Westmorland. The Assize Courts met there, but the former county council sat in Kendal.

Present
Appleby today is in the parliamentary constituency of Penrith and the Border. At the 2019 general election, the Conservative Neil Hudson was elected as the Member of Parliament (MP), replacing Rory Stewart. While the UK remained in the European Union, Appleby was in the North West England European Parliament constituency.

For local government purposes it bridges the Appleby and Bongate wards of Eden District Council and the Appleby Ward of Cumbria County Council. Its own parish council is named Appleby-in-Westmorland Town Council.

Transport
Appleby railway station on the Settle-Carlisle Line was opened by the Midland Railway in 1876. Appleby East station was built nearby by the North Eastern Railway. The former remains, but the latter closed in 1962, although it retains the potential for connection to the Eden Valley Railway.

Notable people
A chronological list of notables from Appleby with a Wikipedia page:
Lady Anne Clifford (1590–1676), helped to shape Appleby by restoring the castle and refurbishing the churches. Her memorial stands beside her mother's in St Lawrence's Church, Boroughgate, where both are buried.
Thomas Barlow (1607/1608–1691), an English academic and clergyman who became Provost of Queen's College, Oxford and Bishop of Lincoln, was born at nearby Orton and attended Appleby Grammar School.
Saint John Boste (1544–1594), at nearby Dufton, attended Appleby Grammar school & Queens College Oxford. He is a saint in the Catholic Church and one of the Forty Martyrs of England and Wales.
William Stobart (born 1961), director and shareholder of Appleby-based WA Developments Ltd
Gavin Skelton (born 1981), football coach
Helen Skelton (born 1983), television presenter, attended Appleby Grammar School.

See also

Listed buildings in Appleby-in-Westmorland

References

External links

Cumbria County History Trust: Appleby (nb: provisional research only – see Talk page)
Appleby-in-Westmorland Society's picture archive updated weekly
Town Council and Tourist Information Centre

 
Towns in Cumbria
Former county towns in England
Westmorland
Civil parishes in Cumbria
Eden District